Claudio Alberto Castro, also known as Claudio O'Connor (born April 28, 1963 in Llavallol, Buenos Aires Province) is a thrash metal, groove metal and hard rock vocalist from Argentina. 
Nowadays he's lead singer of his own band O'Connor and Malón. 
He was also formerly the lead singer of Hermética.

Biography

Mark I
Claudio O'Connor started in the music in 1984. He was recommended by Walter Almada, Horse Power bassist. When O'Connor joins the band as vocalist, it's renamed to Mark I. The band performed over 30 shows until its dissolution in 1987. They recorded two demos, one with two tracks ("Una Farsa Más" and "Traidor") and other with 4 ("El traidor", "(Esto es) Mark", "Tierra marginal" y "Las tablas de la ley").

Hermética
Shortly after, Fabián Spataro (former drummer of Mark I) joined the new musical project of Ricardo Iorio. Spataro insists to Iorio to try Claudio O'Connor as singer. They decided not to continue using the name of V8 band, and Iorio founded along with Antonio Romano, Spataro and O'Connor, Hermética. Shortly after, Spataro left the band for personal reasons and was replaced by Tony Scotto. In 1989 they release debut album, Hermética, through the newly formed label Radio Tripoli. After, they records the EP Intérpretes in 1990. Scotto is replaced by Claudio Strunz, and released the albums Ácido Argentino in 1991 and Víctimas del Vaciamiento in 1994.

Claudio O'Connor remained in the band throughout its existence (1988–1994), as lead singer. While Iorio was a singer and bassist, Antonio Romano was guitarist, and Claudio Strunz, Tony Scotto and Fabián Spataro were drummers.

Malón
Hermética is dissolved due to internal conflicts. As result, three of the four members (O'Connor, Romano and Strunz) meet to form with Karlos Cuadrado, the thrash metal band, Malón. In contrast, Iorio formed Almafuerte. During his career, Malón recorded two studio albums: Espíritu Combativo (1995) and Justicia o Resistencia (1996), besides Resistencia Viva, a live album.

In the early 1998, Claudio O'Connor decides to form a parallel project, creating O'Connor, along with Hernán García.

O'Connor
Within a few months, for several reasons, Claudio decides to quit Malón and devote himself to his new band, which experiments with heavy rock from the 70s. In turn, the other remaining Malón members formed parallel bands.
O'Connor and García, with different line up's, recorded the albums Hay Un Lugar (1999), Yerba Mala Nunca Muere (2000), Dolorización (2002), El Tiempo Es Tan Pequeño (2004), Estamos Pariendo (2006), Naturaleza Muerta (2008), Río Extraño (2010) and Un Poco De Respeto (2012).

Malon's return
In 2011, Claudio and Romano announced the return of the original line up of Malón, with their first show scheduled for December 18 of the same year, at the Arena Malvinas Argentinas of Buenos Aires, which was recorded and released on a DVD called El Regreso Más Esperado ("The Most Expected Return") in 2012. In addition, it's announced the recording of a new studio album, which will be released this year.

Discography

References

External links

www.o-connor.com.ar Official Site of O'Connor band
www.maloncombativo.com Official Site of Malón band

Argentine heavy metal singers
20th-century Argentine male singers
People from Lomas de Zamora Partido
1963 births
Living people
21st-century Argentine male singers